Haijian 66 is a China Marine Surveillance (CMS) ship in the East China Sea Fleet . She is one of the fastest CMS ships in the second building plan. In February 2012, Haijian 66 obstructed Japanese survey vessel Syoyo (HL-01) in disputed waters near Okinawa.

CMS ships of the same class, 1,000t-class Type-II, include Haijian 75.

Haijian 66 was renamed CCG-2166 in July 2013.

References

Ships of the China Marine Surveillance